On 25 January 2022, Poland began building a border wall on the border with Belarus to prevent illegal immigration.

Poland began work on the 5.5-meter (18 foot) high steel wall topped with barbed wire at a cost of around 1,6 billion zł (407m USD) aimed at blocking the passage of illegal  migrants during the border crisis in the region artificially instigated by Belarus in the late summer of 2021. The barrier was completed on 30 June 2022.

Although some media outlets, journalists and celebrities accused Polish governement of using border barrier to prevent entry of irregular asylum seekers no proof has ever been presented for such activity. During and after the intense phase of the border crisis, Poland did not close its border crossings with Belarus and never stopped granting asylum.

See also

References

2022 establishments in Poland
Belarus–Poland border
Belarus–Poland relations
Border barriers constructed during the European migrant crisis
Immigration to Poland